HMS Stag was a 44-gun  fifth-rate frigate built for the Royal Navy during the 1820s, one of three ships of the Andromeda sub-class.

Description
The Andromeda sub-class was a slightly enlarged and improved version of the Druid sub-class, with a more powerful armament. The ship's tonnage was 1167  tons burthen. The Andromeda sub-class was armed with twenty-six 18-pounder cannon on her gundeck, ten 32-pounder carronades and a pair of 68-pounder guns on her quarterdeck and four more 32-pounder carronades in the forecastle. The ships had a crew of 315 officers and ratings.

Construction and career
Stag, the fourth ship of her name to serve in the Royal Navy, was ordered on 9 January 1823, laid down in April 1828 at Pembroke Dockyard, Wales, and launched on 2 October 1830. She was completed for ordinary at Plymouth Dockyard in October 1830. The ship was commissioned on 15 April 1831 and ready for sea by 9 July.

Notes

References

External links
 

Seringapatam-class frigate
1830 ships
Ships built in Pembroke Dock